is a passenger railway station located in  Higashi-ku, Sakai, Osaka Prefecture, Japan, operated by the private railway operator Nankai Electric Railway. It has the station number "NK56".

Lines

Layout
The station consists of two island platforms with an elevated station building.

Platforms

Adjacent stations

History
It is one of the stations on the Koya Line with long history as it was the station of origin operated by Koya Railway, the predecessor of the Koya Line. It was renamed to its present name on September 3, 1900.

Passenger statistics
In fiscal 2019, the station was used by an average of 60,486 passengers daily.

Surrounding area

Public
Sakai City Hall
Sakai Ward Office
Osaka District Court Sakai Branch, Osaka Family Court Sakai Branch, Sakai Summary Court
Sakai Tax Office
Sakai Post Office (Japan Post Holdings)
Japan Post Service Sakai
Japan Post Bank Sakai
Japan Post Insurance Sakai
Sakaihigashi ekimae Post Office (Japan Post Holdings)

Market
Takashimaya

Others
Nankai Bus Terminal
Hochigai Shrine
Tadeiyama Kofun

Buses
Sakaihigashi-ekimae (Nankai Bus)
for Oshoji and -ekimae
for Kanaoka
for Sakai City Hospital, Sagibashi and Dejima
for Kogyo-gakko-mae (Osaka Prefectural Sakai Technology High School), Sagibashi and Dejima
for Kogyo-gakko-mae,  and 
for Intex Osaka, Asia & Pacific Trade Center, and Osaka Prefectural Government Sakishima Building
Kansai Airport limousine "Sorae" for Kansai Airport
for Asaka,  and 
for Oshoji and Ayanocho
for Kinryocho and Ayanocho
for J-GREEN Sakai
for Sakaihama Seaside Stage
Expressway buses for Shinjuku and Tokyo
Expressway buses for Takeo Onsen, Sasebo and Huis Ten Bosch
Expressway buses for Odawara, Fujisawa, Kamakura, Ofuna and Totsuka
Expressway buses for Kashiwazaki, Nagaoka and Sanjo
Expressway buses for Yokohama, Odaiba, Tokyo Disneyland and Chiba
for Sakai-eki nishiguchi and Takumicho (Sharp Sakai Factory)
for Sakaihama Seaside Stage and Sakai-eki nishiguchi
for

See also
 List of railway stations in Japan

References

External links

  

Railway stations in Japan opened in 1898
Railway stations in Osaka Prefecture
Sakai, Osaka